Hafiz Zhafri (born 3 April 2001 in Alor Setar) is a Malaysian professional squash player. As of July 2022, he was ranked number 233 in the world.

References

2001 births
Living people
Malaysian male squash players